John Hubert Stogdon (25 April 1876 – 17 December 1944) was an English first-class cricketer active 1896–1909 who played for Middlesex, Marylebone Cricket Club (MCC) and Cambridge University. He was born in Harrow; died in Pinner. He was educated at Harrow School for whom he played cricket.

His elder brother, Edgar, played in two first-class matches for Cambridge University in 1893.

References

1876 births
1944 deaths
People educated at Harrow School
English cricketers
Middlesex cricketers
Marylebone Cricket Club cricketers
Cambridge University cricketers
H. D. G. Leveson Gower's XI cricketers